Wedding Song (أفراح القبة Afrāh al-Qubba) also known as joys of the dome is a 1981 Arabic-language novel by Naguib Mahfouz. In the novel a narrator tells and retells the story of a marriage, each time from different character's perspective. 
In Naguib Mahfouz's 1981 novel Wedding Song , the narrator tells and retells the story of a marriage from the very different perspectives of the main characters, deepening the reader's understanding of “what happened in the end we read the true story by the main narrator ( the husband )."  In ramadan of 2016 there was an Egyptian TV series with same name.

References

Novels by Naguib Mahfouz
1981 novels